Bernard Nyarko (died 2 May 2020), commonly known in show business as Bishop Bernard Nyarko, was a Ghanaian actor and comedian who recently became a full-time preacher. He was known for the Hero: Service to Humanity (2017) and Sidechic Gang (2018) movies.

Life and career 
Bernard Nyarko was his parents' seventh-born child among 14 other siblings. He was married with three children. He came into the limelight around 2012 and was featured in several local Ghanaian movies, including Wanted, Aban Bo sia, Boyz Abre, Sunsum Police, John and John and others.

Education 
Nyarko began his kindergarten education at the Swedru Salvation Army in the Central Region of Ghana, where his parents were staying at the time due to work commitments. He then moved to Primary one at Nsawam, where his mother, who worked at the Public Works Department, stayed. Since his father, who served as a police officer, had been transferred to the Kumawu area, Nyarko moved to Kumawu Presby Primary School for his Primary two (2). He went on to Asem Boys M/A Primary School in Kumasi after his father was transferred to the Zongo Police station in Kumasi. He completed form five at Tweneboah Koduah Senior High School, Kumawu. He finally completed his sixth-form studies at Osei Kyeretwie Senior High.

Filmography
Hero: Service to Humanity
Sidechic Gang
John and John

Achievements 
Bernard Nyarko was honoured in 2017 by Kwame Nkrumah University of Science and Technology (KNUST) for his contribution to the National Union of Ghana Students (NUGS).

References

External links 

Ghanaian comedians
Ghanaian male film actors
Ghanaian actors
Kwame Nkrumah University of Science and Technology alumni
2020 deaths

Year of birth missing
Place of birth missing
Place of death missing
People from Kumasi